Gli Innamorati (meaning "The Lovers") were stock characters within the theatre style known as commedia dell'arte, who appeared in 16th century Italy. In the plays, everything revolved around the Lovers in some regard.  These dramatic and posh characters were present within commedia plays for the sole purpose of being in love with one another, and moreover, with themselves. These characters move elegantly and smoothly, and their young faces are unmasked unlike other commedia dell'arte characters. Despite facing many obstacles, the Lovers were always united by the end.

Origins 
The name Innamorati is the Italian word for "Lovers".

The dramatists of the Italian Renaissance borrowed ideas from early Roman playwrights, such as Plautus and Terence, whom the theater style known as commedia erudita was inspired by. The "lovers" are the first actor, first actress, second actor and second actress.

Characteristics and dramatic function 
The comedy of the Lovers is that they are ridiculous and over the top about everything, but they are completely sincere in their emotions. The main function of the Lovers within the play is to be in love; and in doing so, they come upon obstacles that keep them from pursuing their relationship. These obstacles stemmed from varied causes. For instance, the financial or personal interests of a lover's parent may have prevented the lovers' relationship from progressing. The pair always involves other commedia characters, such as Zanni characters, to try to figure out how they can be together. This is necessary, because due to their conceited stupidity, and lack of experience with the all of the mysteries of love, and the sensations and emotions that come with it, they cannot figure it out on their own.

The Lovers tend to be overly dramatic in whatever emotion they express. Separation from their lover leads them to strongly lament and moan their state, although, once they finally meet, they are at a loss of words. In order to express what they truly want to say, they always need the help of a servant to act as a go-between. The Lovers often act in a childlike and immature way. When not getting their way, they become completely devastated, they pout, and even cry and whine if things do not go according to their wishes. Very selfish and self-centered, the Lovers are in their own worlds where they are each the most important subjects. Along with loving themselves, they are in love with the very idea of love and what it pertains to.

Physical appearance and attributes 
The Lovers are always young in age, possessing courteousness and gallantry. They are very educated, but lack life experiences that would have prepared them for the real world. They are very attractive and elegant in their appearance overall.

The women's dresses were of the finest silks and they wear showy jewelry characteristic of Renaissance style. The males wear soldier-like attire, while both genders wear extravagant wigs and also change clothes numerous times throughout the length of the production. The costumes of the lovers were the fashion of the day, and the extravagance of the Lovers costumes often represented the status of the Commedia dell'arte company.

The Lovers never wear the masks, which is characteristic of most of the other stock characters in the commedia dell'arte. They do, however, wear a large amount of makeup and apply beauty marks to their faces.

Their speech is very eloquent Tuscan, as they are of high social status. When commedia dell'arte is played in England the lovers often speak in Received Pronunciation. They are well-read in poetry and often recite it at length from memory, and even tend to sing quite often. Their language is full of flamboyant and lofty rhetoric so that most of what they say is not taken too seriously, by either the audience or the other characters.  Although their dramatics were laughable, their struggle as a romantic couple added a cultural layer to the show, adding tone of seriousness to the show.

Physicality 
The Innamorati do everything perfectly and strive for perfection. Their movements are elegant and are not to be aimed towards parody. They occasionally do courtly dances using two dance movements called "pas", and "swivel".

The posture that the Lovers take on is that of strong pride. They point their toes while standing and puff up their chests. Overall, they lack contact with the ground and seem to float across the ground rather than take steps. Their hand movements and gestures are also very characteristic of the buoyant movements that their feet take on. The physicality of the Lovers should not be done in a way that makes fun of them.

Relationships 
Following that, they do love each other, but are more consumed with the idea of being in love. They never outwardly communicate with their lover even when they are in close contact, due to nerves, and, therefore, never really outwardly express affection toward their beloved. The Lovers commonly fight or bicker. Despite the bitter interactions, the Lovers mostly reconcile their differences by the end of the play and end up happily together and/or married. The Lovers are usually the children of either Dottore or Pantalone.

The Lovers are aware of the audience's presence. They use the audience as a means to show themselves off and also to express their plight at not being able to obtain their love. In other ways, they may also call on an audience member for help or advice, or even flirt with someone who is watching from their T.V.

Rhetorical conceits used 
 Alliteration
 Allusion
 Antithesis
 Assonance
 Hyperbole
 Interrogation
 Invocation
 Irony
 Metaphor
 Prosopopoeia
 Conceit

Entering and exiting 
The Lovers use Usite (exits) and Chiusette (endings) sometimes when entering and exiting. These are rhyming couplets that are said before exiting and entering a scene.

Variations on names 
Since the Lovers are stock characters, the names of both the male and female lovers are used over and over again:

Males 
Arsenio
Aurielo
Cinthio
Fabrizio
Flavio
Fedelindo
Florindo
Flaminio
Leandro
Lélio
Lindoro
Mario
Ortensio
Ottavio
Orazio
Sireno, often the son of Pantalone.
Silvio
Tristano

Females 
Angelica
Aurelia
Beatrice
Bianchetta
Celia
Clarice
Clori
Cinzio
Emilia
Eularia
Flaminia, played by Elena Balletti having inherited the role from her grandmother
Florinda, famously portrayed by Virginia Ramponi-Andreini who also used "La Florinda" as her stage name
Filesia
Filli, often daughter of Pantalone.
Isabella
Lavinia
Lidia
Ortensia
Rosalinda
Silvia
Turchetta
Vittoria

References 

Commedia dell'arte characters
Romance characters
Couples
Fictional characters introduced in the 16th century